Arthur Morgan Rees CBE, QPM, DL (20 November 1912 – 13 May 1998) was a Welsh international rugby union flanker, the Chief Constable of Denbighshire and later of Stafford and Stoke-on-Trent, a sports' administrator and World War II fighter pilot.

Biography
Rees was born in the village of Llangadog in 1912. He was raised as a Welsh speaker, not learning English until the age of seven. He was educated at Llandovery College before matriculating to St Catharine's College, Cambridge, earning two rugby blues. He joined the Metropolitan Police after leaving Cambridge in 1935, joining the Royal Air Force after the outbreak of the Second World War. Serving as a pilot, he rose to the rank of squadron leader, ending as acting wing commander.

Rees was capped for Wales 13 times, most notably as pack leader in 1935 when they beat the All Blacks 13-12. It was described by journalist JBG Thomas as, "The most exciting international match ever played in Wales."

In 1943 he married Dorothy Webb, with whom he would have a daughter, Rosemary. With the end of the war, he returned to the Metropolitan force, rising through the ranks until becoming the Chief Constable of Denbighshire in 1957. He remained with the Welsh force until 1964, when he became the Chief Constable of Staffordshire.

Awards
Rees received several awards for his many years as a high ranking police officer and his work on sporting bodies. In 1960 he was appointed Officer of the Order of the British Empire, which was followed by Commander of the Order of the British Empire in the 1974 Birthday Honours. He was awarded the Queen's Police Medal in 1970 and was made a Deputy Lieutenant to Staffordshire in 1967. In May 1977 he was granted the Freedom of the City of London and in November of the same year was made a Knight of the Order of St John.

Bibliography

References

1912 births
1998 deaths
Officers in English police forces
Officers in Welsh police forces
Alumni of St Catharine's College, Cambridge
Barbarian F.C. players
British Chief Constables
Metropolitan Police officers
British World War II pilots
Cambridge University R.U.F.C. players
Commanders of the Order of the British Empire
Deputy Lieutenants of Staffordshire
Knights of the Order of St John
London Welsh RFC players
People educated at Llandovery College
Welsh recipients of the Queen's Police Medal
Rugby union flankers
Rugby union players from Carmarthenshire
Wales international rugby union players
Welsh police officers
Welsh rugby union players
Wrexham RFC players